Beaten Into Submission is the debut album by Finnish metal band Profane Omen. It was recorded 27 January-12 February 2006 at Hideaway and Villvox Studios by Aleksanteri Kuosa and Ville Sorvali. Recording was assisted by Secret Agent and Star Super Force. The album was mixed at Villvox by Aleksanteri Kuosa and mastered at Finnvox Studios by Minerva Pappi. Ville Sorvali (from Moonsorrow) was the producer and the co-producer was Aleksanteri Kuosa. Songs "Adrenaline" and "Enemies" were co-produced by Panu Willman.

Beaten Into Submission was also #28 on Finnish top-50 charts.

Track listing

Chart positions

Personnel

Jules Näveri: Vocals
Williami Kurki: Guitar
Antti Kokkonen: Guitar
Tuomas "Tomppa" Saarenketo: Bass
Samuli Mikkonen: Drums

External links

References

Profane Omen albums
2006 debut albums